Eldora is a city in Hardin County, Iowa, United States. The population was 2,663 at the time of the 2020 census. It is the county seat of Hardin County.

History
Eldora was platted in 1853. It was incorporated on July 1, 1895.

The name Eldora was given to the town by a local mother in honor of her dead infant daughter. It is derived from the Spanish name for "the gilded".

Geography
Eldora is located at  (42.360155, -93.101325).

Eldora is located on east edge of the Altmont Moraine, the glacial moraine that marks the east border of the Des Moines Lobe of the Wisconsin Glaciation. The town is just west of the gorge of the Iowa River that borders the moraine.  The river here has cut through the sandstone bedrock underlying the moraine.

Climate
Designated as having a humid continental climate, this region typically has a large seasonal temperature differences, with warm to hot (and often humid) summers and cold (sometimes severely cold) winters. Precipitation is relatively well distributed year-round in many areas with this climate.  The Köppen Climate Classification subtype for this climate is "Dfa" (Hot Summer Continental Climate).

Demographics

2010 census
At the 2010 census there were 2,732 people, 1,079 households, and 671 families living in the city. The racial makup of the city was 94.8% White, 2.0% African American, 0.3% Native American, 0.6% Asian, 0.7% from other races, and 1.6% from two or more races. Hispanic or Latino of any race were 3.7%.

Of the 1,079 households 27.7% had children under the age of 18 living with them, 48.7% were married couples living together, 8.6% had a female householder with no husband present, 4.8% had a male householder with no wife present, and 37.8% were non-families. 33.1% of households were one person and 17.7% were one person aged 65 or older. The average household size was 2.27 and the average family size was 2.87.

The median age was 41.6 years. 26.5% of residents were under the age of 18; 6.8% were between the ages of 18 and 24; 20.4% were from 25 to 44; 25.8% were from 45 to 64; and 20.5% were 65 or older. The gender makeup of the city was 51.7% male and 48.3% female.

2000 census
At the 2000 census there were 3,035 people, 1,193 households, and 742 families living in the city. The racial makup of the city was 95.49% White, 1.32% African American, 0.23% Native American, 0.69% Asian, 0.23% Pacific Islander, 1.55% from other races, and 0.49% from two or more races. Hispanic or Latino of any race were 2.97%.

Of the 1,193 households 30.3% had children under the age of 18 living with them, 49.7% were married couples living together, 9.0% had a female householder with no husband present, and 37.8% were non-families. 34.2% of households were one person and 17.6% were one person aged 65 or older. The average household size was 2.27 and the average family size was 2.89.

29.8% are under the age of 18, 6.6% from 18 to 24, 22.2% from 25 to 44, 20.6% from 45 to 64, and 20.9% 65 or older. The median age was 39 years. For every 100 females, there were 99.1 males. For every 100 females age 18 and over, there were 82.1 males.

The median household income was $33,170 and the median family income  was $39,421. Males had a median income of $31,545 versus $17,891 for females. The per capita income for the city was $15,459. About 5.9% of families and 6.9% of the population were below the poverty line, including 6.6% of those under age 18 and 2.9% of those age 65 or over.

Education
The community is within the Eldora–New Providence Community School District, which formed on July 1, 1980, with the merger of the Eldora and New Providence school districts. , it has a grade-sharing arrangement with Hubbard–Radcliffe Community School District and operates as "South Hardin Schools".  South Hardin High School is located in Eldora.  Mr. Michael Rundall serves as Principal (2016).  South Hardin Middle School is located in Hubbard.  Mrs. Sarah Nachazel serves as Principal (2019).

Media
The Eldora Herald-Ledger is a weekly newspaper covering both Eldora and Hardin County events including the schools AGWSR, BCLUW, and South Hardin. Since November 2014, it has been printed on Tuesdays by the Hampton, Iowa based Mid-America Publishing Corporation.

Parks and recreation
Eldora is located adjacent to the Iowa River and Pine Lake State Park.

Infrastructure
The city is the location of the State Training School for Boys, a school for male juvenile delinquents.

Notable people

George C. Armstrong, Illinois state senator and newspaper editor; born in Eldora.

Thomas DeBaggio, (1942-2011) Journalist and author
George Gardner Fagg, Senior United States federal judge on the United States Court of Appeals for the Eighth Circuit; born in Eldora.
Jonathan Hole, actor in vaudeville, radio, TV, and film; born in Eldora.
Mona Van Duyn, winner of the 1991 Pulitzer Prize for Poetry and the 1992–1993 U.S. Poet Laureate; grew up in Eldora.

Twister movie
The city is most famous for the shooting of the 1996 movie Twister on location. The true final part of the climactic F5 tornado was filmed at the old Follett house in Eldora which is now a private home.

See also

Buildings listed on the National Register of Historic Places:
First Congregational Church
Hardin County Courthouse

References

External links

The official city website of Eldora Iowa Portal style website, Government, Business, Library, Recreation and more
City-Data Comprehensive Statistical Data and more about Eldora

 
Cities in Iowa
Cities in Hardin County, Iowa
County seats in Iowa
Populated places established in 1895
1895 establishments in Iowa